SLR Siemiatycze (Makarki) is a  tall partially guyed tower, consisting of a free-standing lattice tower with a guyed mast on top, for FM and TV situated at Makarki near Siemiatycze in Podlaskie Voivodeship, Poland. It is also referred to as Makarki Directional Radio Tower.

Major Transmitters
The licensed transmitters at this location are:

See also
 List of towers

References 

 Diagram of Tower
 http://radiopolska.pl/wykaz/pokaz_lokalizacja.php?pid=104

Siemiatycze County
Buildings and structures in Podlaskie Voivodeship
Radio masts and towers in Poland